Troy Isley (born September 5, 1998) is an American professional boxer. As an amateur, he won a bronze medal at both the 2017 World Championships and 2019 Pan American Games.

Amateur career

Olympic result
Tokyo 2020
Round of 32: Defeated Vitali Bandarenka (Belarus) 5–0
Round of 16: Defeated by Gleb Bakshi (Russia) 3–2

World Championships result
Hamburg 2017
Round of 16: Defeated Hosam Bakr Abdin (Egypt) 5–0
Quarter-finals: Defeated Israil Madrimov (Uzbekistan) 3–2
Semi-finals: Defeated by Oleksandr Khyzhniak (Ukraine) 4–1

Pan American Games result
Lima 2019
Quarter-finals: Defeated Jorge Vivas (Colombia) 3–2
Semi-finals: Defeated by Hebert Conceição (Brazil) 4–1

Professional career
On January 19, 2021 it was announced that Isley had signed a promotional contract with Top Rank where he would be promoted by Bob Arum. Isley made his professional debut on February 13, scoring a unanimous decision (UD) victory against Bryant Costello.

On January 15, 2022 Isley faced Harry Keenan Cruz Cubano on the undercard of Joe Smith Jr. vs Steve Geffrard at the Turning Stone Resort Casino in Verona, New York. In a bout which saw Isley receive a point deduction in round six for repeated low blows, he went on win via UD with two judges scoring the bout 59–54 and the third scoring it 59–53.

Professional boxing record

References

External links
Team USA profile for Troy Isley

Living people
1998 births
American male boxers
Boxers from Washington, D.C.
Middleweight boxers
AIBA World Boxing Championships medalists
Pan American Games medalists in boxing
Pan American Games bronze medalists for the United States
Medalists at the 2019 Pan American Games
Boxers at the 2020 Summer Olympics
Olympic boxers of the United States